Yankee Doodle Boy is a 1929 short film released by Paramount Famous Lasky Corporation and produced by Fleischer Studios. It was named after the song "The Yankee Doodle Boy" an equivalent to "Yankee Doodle" and was released in part of the Screen Songs.

References

External links
 

1929 short films
1929 animated films
American black-and-white films
Paramount Pictures short films
Fleischer Studios short films
Short films directed by Dave Fleischer
Films based on songs
1920s English-language films
American animated short films
Sing-along